Robert Lewis Paddock (December 24, 1869 – May 17, 1939) was first bishop of the Episcopal Diocese of Eastern Oregon, serving from 1907 until his retirement in 1922.

Early Life and Education 
Paddock was born on December 24, 1869 in New York City to the Reverend John A. Paddock, later Bishop of Olympia, and Frances Chester Fanning. He was also the nephew of Benjamin Henry Paddock, Bishop of Massachusetts. He studied at Trinity College and graduated with a Bachelor of Arts in 1894, a Master of Arts in 1897, and was awarded a Doctor of Sacred Theology in 1910. He also studied theology at the Berkeley Divinity School and graduated with a Bachelor of Divinity in 1897, and was awarded a Doctor of Divinity in 1908. Hobart College also awarded him a Bachelor of Sacred Theology in 1908.

Ordained Ministry 
Paddock was ordained deacon on June 1, 1897 by Bishop William Woodruff Niles of New Hampshire, at Trinity Church, Middletown, Connecticut. He then was in charge of St Paul's Mission in Southington, Connecticut in 1897, and later became general secretary of the Church Students’ Missionary Association and assistant at St Paul’s Church in Cleveland, Ohio between 1897 and 1898. While in Ohio he was ordained priest on May 29, 1898 by Bishop William Andrew Leonard of Ohio in St Paul’s Church. He then became vicar of the Stanton street mission, known as the Pro Cathedral in New York City, and was installed as a canon of the chapter of the Cathedral of St. John the Divine, where he remained until 1902. he later served as rector of the Church of the Holy Apostles in New York City from 1902 to 1907.

Episcopacy
Paddock was elected by the House of Bishops on the third ballot to become the first Missionary Bishop of Eastern Oregon in 1907. He was consecrated on December 18, 1907 in the Church of the Holy Apostles by Presiding Bishop Daniel S. Tuttle. He spent the next 15 year ministering in Eastern Oregon while promoting the bringing together of existing churches of various denominations rather than building new Episcopal churches. He was also quite unorthodox in relation to record keeping, reports, accounting, and secretaries, things which he deemed unimportant. Between 1918 and 1919 he took a short leave to minister in the YMCA in France. He retired in September 1922 due to poor health. 

After his retirement he married H. Jean Aitken on January 9, 1923, who had died on January 31, 1938. He himself died on May 17, 1939 at St. John's Episcopal Hospital in New York City, after being admitted on January 10. His funeral was held at the Church of the Holy Apostles officiated by Bishop Charles Kendall Gilbert. He was then cremated and his ashes scattered.

References 

1869 births
1939 deaths
Episcopal bishops of Eastern Oregon
Berkeley Divinity School alumni